Clemente Primieri (12 May 1894 – 15 February 1981) was an Italian general, best known for being the leader of Gruppo di Combattimento Cremona, one of the units of the Italian Co-Belligerent Army which fought alongside the Allies in the latter part of World War II.

Biography
He entered the Modena Military Academy at age 18 and at the end of his course he was assigned to 2nd Mountain Artillery Regiment; at the start of the First World War the unit was sent to the frontline and in 1916 Primieri was promoted to Capitano (Captain) for war merit. 
In 1936, as a Tenente Colonnello (Lieutenant Colonel) he took part to the Second Italo-Abyssinian War. In 1937 he became the commander of the 28° Artillery Regiment of the "Livorno" Division.

During the Second World War he was appointed Chief of Staff of the 2nd Army High Command. After the Armistice of Cassibile on 8 September 1943 he took over the 44 Infantry Division Cremona which expelled the Germans from Corsica after heavy fighting. The Division was reformed on 23 July 1944 and became Gruppo di Combattimento Cremona (one of the units of the Italian Co-Belligerent Army), which was positioned on the right flank of the British Eighth Army. Under Primieri's command, the Group followed the northward drive of the Allied Armies and contributed to the liberation of several cities including Portomaggiore, Codigoro, Rovigo, Padua and finally Venice on 2 May 1945.

At the end of the war he remained the commander of the new "Cremona" Division, stationed at Turin.

He was then transferred to the 4th Mountain Army Corps, of which he was commander from July 1952 up till 1954, and later on served in the Verona Allied Land Forces Southern Europe Command.

He died in Sanremo on 15 February 1981 and was laid to rest in the Camerlona War Cemetery in the Comune of Ravenna, alongside the war dead of Gruppo di Combattimento "Cremona".

Honors and awards
 Grand Officer of the Military Order of Italy

30 December 1952

 1st Class / Knight Grand Cross of the Order of Merit of the Italian Republic
28 November 1957.

 Knight of the Military Order of Italy
30 May 1950.

See also
 Luigi Giorgi, a fellow member of Gruppo di Combattimento "Cremona".

References

External links
 http://digilander.libero.it/lacorsainfinita/guerra2/personaggi/primieri.htm
 http://www.anpi.it/donne-e-uomini/clemente-primieri

Italian generals
Italian military personnel of World War I
Italian military personnel of World War II
Italian soldiers
Military personnel from Turin
Recipients of the Order of Merit of the Italian Republic
Recipients of the Military Order of Italy
1981 deaths
1894 births